Tel Yitzhak is a kibbutz in central Israel. Located in the coastal plain to the south-east of Netanya, it falls under the jurisdiction of Hof HaSharon Regional Council.

History
The region of Tel Yitzhak, bordering the wetlands of the Poleg stream, has been inhabited intermittently since the Middle Paleolithic age, with peak periods of settlement during the Middle and Late Bronze Age (17th–13th centuries BCE), the Byzantine (4th–7th centuries CE) and Late Ottoman periods (19–early 20th centuries CE). Before the 20th century the area formed part of the Forest of Sharon and was part of the lands of the village of Ghabat Kafr Sur. It was an open woodland dominated by Mount Tabor Oak, which extended from Kfar Yona in the north to Ra'anana in the south. The local Arab inhabitants traditionally used the area for pasture, firewood and intermittent cultivation. The intensification of settlement and agriculture in the coastal plain during the 19th century led to deforestation and subsequent environmental degradation.

The kibbutz was established in 1938 by General Zionist immigrants from Galicia as part of the tower and stockade settlement campaign. It was named after Yitzhak Steiger, a leader of HaNoar HaTzioni in Galicia.

Masua, a center for Holocaust research and commemoration, was established on the kibbutz.

Nature reserve
Southwest of the kibbutz is an  8-dunam nature reserve established in 1968 to protect flora and fauna native to the Sharon plain. Flora includes Ceratonia siliqua, Calicotome villosa, Thymelaea hirsuta, Prasium majus, Anagyris, and Lavandula stoechas.

Historic images

References

Kibbutzim
Populated places established in 1938
Nature reserves in Israel
Populated places in Central District (Israel)
Protected areas of Central District (Israel)
1938 establishments in Mandatory Palestine
Polish-Jewish culture in Israel